The Maxwell National Wildlife Refuge, located in the high central plains of northeastern New Mexico,  was established in 1965 as a feeding and resting area for migratory birds. Over  of the refuge are planted with wheat, corn, barley, and alfalfa to provide food for resident and migratory wildlife. Visitors may see bald and golden eagles, falcons, hawks, sandhill cranes, ducks, white pelicans, burrowing owls, great horned owls, black-tailed prairie dogs, raccoons, coyotes, skunks, cougars, muskrats, badgers, bobcats, mule deer, white-tailed deer, and the occasional elk.

References

External links

 

National Wildlife Refuges in New Mexico
Protected areas of Colfax County, New Mexico
Protected areas established in 1965
1965 establishments in New Mexico